Chicken Curry Law is a 2019 Bollywood drama film directed by Shekhar Sirrinn. The film stars Ashutosh Rana, Natalia Janoszek, Nivedita Bhattacharya and Mukesh Hariawala. It is distributed by Panorama Studios. It was theatrically released in India on 9 August 2019.

Plot 
A foreign belly dancer, Maya, is raped & left to die by sons (Makiya and Nana) of a Mumbai based politician. A social activist, Satya, and a lawyer, Sitapati, leave no stone unturned to get justice for Maya. However, Satya is killed in the process, even as Sitapati continues to fight the legal battle. The court acquits the suspects. Sitapati instigates Makiya and his brother and both the brothers shoot him dead and get arrested. Maya turns into a social activist in the same NGO where Satya used to work.

Cast 
Ashutosh Rana as Sitapati Shukla
Natalia Janoszek as Maya Johnson
Nivedita Bhattacharya Satya Deshmukh
Makrand Deshpande as Mutthu Swamy
Ganesh Pai as Makiya
Zakir Hussain as Sharad Joshi
Aman Verma as Chagan Patil

Release 
The film was scheduled to be released in 2018 but was postponed. It is now to be released on 9 August 2019. 

The film was released theatrically on 9 August 2019.

Soundtrack 

The music of the film is composed by Shekhar Sirrinn while lyrics are  written Shekhar Sirrinn, Shabbir Ahmed and Rajesh Manthan.

References

External links 
 
 

2019 films
2010s Hindi-language films
Indian black comedy films
Films about rape in India